Jonah Koech Kipruto (born 12 December 1996) is a Kenyan-born middle-distance runner who represents the United States in international competitions. He specializes in the 800 metres, which he qualified for at the 2022 World Athletics Championships and 2022 NACAC Championships after finishing second at the 2022 USA Outdoor Track and Field Championships.

External Links
Jonah Koech profile USATF
Jonah Koech profile United States Army

References

1996 births
Living people
American male middle-distance runners
Kenyan male middle-distance runners
Texas Tech Red Raiders men's track and field athletes